Analytica Chimica Acta is a peer-reviewed scientific journal published since 1947 that covers original research and reviews of fundamental and applied aspects of analytical chemistry.

See also 
 List of scientific journals in chemistry
 Analytical chemistry
 Chemistry

References

Elsevier academic journals
Chemistry journals
Publications established in 1947
Weekly journals
English-language journals
1947 establishments in the Netherlands